Holy Trinity Greek Orthodox Church is located in Sioux City, Iowa, United States. Designed by architect William L. Steele, the church building has been listed on the National Register of Historic Places since 1998.

History
Paikos K. Pappaphilipopoulos, who would Americanize his name to "Peter Nelson", led the organization of a church. Their initial meeting was held at a Knights of Columbus Hall. In 1920, they purchased property near the downtown area for 35,000. There was a house on the property that was used as the parish's first church. Father Constantinos Harvelas served as the church's first pastor.

It is the oldest and largest Orthodox Church building in Iowa. In , a fire gutted the church's interior. Christ Kamages of San Francisco served as architect for the renovation while iconographer Elias Damianakis of Florida and woodcarver Steve Kavroulakis of Crete designed and built a new altar, sanctuary, narthex, iconostasion, and iconography.

References

External links

 
 archINFORM

20th-century Eastern Orthodox church buildings
Christian organizations established in 1918
Church buildings with domes
Churches completed in 1926
Churches in Sioux City, Iowa
Churches on the National Register of Historic Places in Iowa
Eastern Orthodox churches in Iowa
Greek-American culture in Iowa
Greek Orthodox churches in the United States
National Register of Historic Places in Sioux City, Iowa
William L. Steele buildings